The 2003–04 Regionalliga season was the tenth season of the Regionalliga tier three of the German football league system. It was contested in two geographical divisions with eighteen teams each. The competition began on 1 August 2003 with the first matches of each division and ended on the 5 June 2004.

Team movements

Teams Promoted to 2. Bundesliga

From Nord
Erzgebirge Aue
VfL Osnabrück

From Süd
SpVgg Unterhaching
Jahn Regensburg

Teams Relegated from 2. Bundesliga

To Nord
Eintracht Braunschweig
FC St. Pauli

To Süd
SSV Reutlingen	
SV Waldhof Mannheim

Teams Relegated to Oberliga

From Nord
SC Verl
SV Babelsberg 03
Bayer Leverkusen II
Dresdner SC

From Süd
Stuttgarter Kickers
Sportfreunde Siegen
SV Darmstadt 98
Eintracht Frankfurt II
Borussia Neunkirchen

Teams promoted from Oberliga

To Nord
FC Schalke 04 II(Oberliga Westfalen Champions)
Sachsen Leipzig(NOFV-Oberliga Nord Champions)

To Süd
VfB Stuttgart II(Oberliga Baden-Württemberg Champions)
1. SC Feucht(Bayernliga Champions)
1. FSV Mainz 05(Oberliga Südwest Champions)

Regionalligas

Regionalliga Nord

Table

Top scorers

Source: Weltfussball.de

Regionalliga Süd

Table

Top scorers

Source: Weltfussball.de

References

External links
 Regionalliga at the German Football Association 
 Regionalliga Nord 2003–04 at kicker.de
 Regionalliga Süd 2003–04 at kicker.de

Regionalliga seasons
3
Germ